André Prévost,  (30 July 193427 January 2001) was a Canadian composer and music educator. He was awarded the Canadian Music Council Medal in 1977 and in 1985 he was made an Officer of the Order of Canada. He also received the "Trophy for Concert Music" from the Performing Rights Organization of Canada.

Early life and education
He was born in Hawkesbury, Ontario. He grew up in Saint-Jérôme, Quebec.

Prévost was trained at the Conservatoire de musique du Québec à Montréal where he was a pupil of Isabelle Delorme, Jean Papineau-Couture, and Clermont Pépin. Following graduation, he was awarded grants from the Canada Council and the Government of Québec which enabled him to study with Olivier Messiaen and Henri Dutilleux in Paris. In 1963 he won the Prix d'Europe, an award which provided him with the opportunity to study electroacoustic music under Michel Philippot.

Career

During the 1960s Prévost taught at the Tanglewood Music Centre with fellow faculty members Aaron Copland, Zoltán Kodály, Gunther Schuller and Elliott Carter. In April 1967, accompanied by Michèle Lalonde, he performed the oratorio Terre des hommes at the Place des arts opening ceremonies of the Expo 67 world's fair in Montreal, attended by the official delegations of its participating countries, where they strongly projected French writer's Antoine de Saint-Exupéry 'idealist rhetoric'. From the mid-1970s until his retirement in 1996, he was a professor of music at the Université de Montréal. Among his notable students were composers José Evangelista, Denis Gougeon, Anne Lauber, José Manuel Montañés, and Michel Longtin.

His composition style has been compared to that of Alban Berg.

Prévost died in Montreal, Quebec, Canada.

References

External links
 Journal d'une création - Film directed by James Dormeyer with Chantal Juillet, Charles Dutoit and André Prévost
 André Prévost and José Manuel Montañés at the University of Montreal
 André Prévost fonds (R15426) at Library and Archives Canada

1934 births
2001 deaths
Conservatoire de musique du Québec à Montréal alumni
Academic staff of the Université de Montréal
Canadian music academics
Canadian male composers
Musicians from Ontario
Musicians from Quebec
People from Hawkesbury, Ontario
People from Saint-Jérôme
Officers of the Order of Canada
20th-century Canadian composers
20th-century musicologists
20th-century Canadian male musicians